Tiara is the fifth studio album and the second concept album (after Mercy Falls) by Swedish progressive metal band Seventh Wonder, released on 12 October 2018. It is the band's first studio album in almost eight years since The Great Escape (2010) and their first album with drummer Stefan Norgren, who joined the band in 2011.

Track listing 
All songs composed by Seventh Wonder.
 "Arrival" – 1:30
 "The Everones" – 6:13
 "Dream Machines" – 5:38
 "Against the Grain" – 6:58
 "Victorious" – 4:55
 "Tiara's Song (Farewell Pt. 1)" – 7:16
 "Goodnight (Farewell Pt. 2)" – 7:10
 "Beyond Today (Farewell Pt. 3)" – 5:06
 "The Truth" – 4:17
 "By the Light of the Funeral Pyres" – 3:54
 "Damnation Below" – 6:44
 "Procession" – 0:45
 "Exhale" – 9:30

Personnel 
All information from the album booklet.

Seventh Wonder
Tommy Karevik – vocals, lyrics, producer
Andreas Söderin – keyboard
Johan Liefvendahl – guitar
Andreas Blomqvist – bass, lyrics, producer
Stefan Norgren – drums, additional vocals

Additional musicians
Jenny Karevik – additional vocals, co-lead vocals (track 9)
Johan Larsson – additional vocals, artwork
Kobra Paige – additional vocals
Michele Coombe – additional vocals
Jenna Blomqvist – additional vocals
Arto Järvelä – violin

Production
Øyvind Larsen – mixing
Jens Bogren – mastering

Charts

References 

2018 albums
Seventh Wonder albums